Youngster may refer to:

 a child
 the Fisher Youngster single seat aircraft